Claudia Barattini (born 1960) is a Chilean teacher and political scientist. She was a minister during the second government of Michelle Bachelet.

Barattini was director of La Morada Women's Development Corporation (1998−1999), cultural attaché of the Chilean Embassy in Italy (2006−2010) and director of Foreign Affairs of the Teatro a Mil Foundation (2010−2014). For three seasons, she was the curator of the Chilean pavilion at the Venice Biennale.

Bio
After the 1973 coup d'état led by general Augusto Pinochet against the Marxist government of Salvador Allende (1970−1973), Barattini went into exile algonside his parents in 1974. First, she lived in Poland and then in Italy, where he studied classical ballet at the National Academy of Dance in Rome for then study three years of economics at La Sapienza University.

In the 1980s, Barattini returned to Chile and tried to resume her studies in economics at the University of Chile, where she was at the career of trade management. Nevertheless, she left that last one and began to study History at the Metropolitan University of Educational Sciences (UMCE)

References

External links
 

1960 births
Living people
University of Chile alumni
Sapienza University of Rome alumni
21st-century Chilean politicians
Democratic Revolution politicians
People from Valparaíso
Culture ministers of Chile
Chilean women curators